Euchromius labellum is a species of moth in the family Crambidae. It is found in Kenya.

The length of the forewings is 11–13 mm. The groundcolour of the forewings is creamy white, densely suffused with ochreous to dark brown scales. The hindwings are creamy white to grey with a darkly bordered termen. Adults are on wing in February and March.

References

Endemic moths of Kenya
Moths described in 1988
Crambinae
Moths of Africa